The Patna - Hatia Super Express was an express train belonging to South Eastern Railway zone that runs between Patna Junction and Hatia in India. It was currently being operated with 18625/18626 train numbers on daily basis. Now this is merged with Kosi Express.

Notes

See also 

 Patna Junction railway station
 Hatia railway station
 Patna - Hatia Patliputra Express
 Patna - Hatia Super Express
 Kosi Express

References

External links 

 18625/Patna - Hatia Super Express
 18626/Hatia - Patna Super Express

Transport in Ranchi
Transport in Patna
Express trains in India
Rail transport in Bihar
Rail transport in Jharkhand
Rail transport in West Bengal